Jørgen Christensen-Dalsgaard (born 6 October 1950) is a Danish astronomer at Aarhus University in Denmark. He specializes in asteroseismology and helioseismology. He has made significant contributions to both fields, including predicting the oscillation of Sun-like stars in 1983. He is the head of "Rumudvalget" (the committee of space of the Danish Ministry of Science, Technology and Innovation) and the Stellar Astrophysics Centre (SAC) supported by the Danish National Research Foundation. He is co-investigator on the Kepler mission and, with Hans Kjeldsen in Aarhus, leads the 500+ researchers in the Kepler Asteroseismic Science Consortium (KASC). KASC is responsible for the asteroseismology component of the Kepler mission. Christensen-Dalsgaard has published several papers on this subject. He was also previously the president of Commission 27 of the International Astronomical Union.

He has been featured on Danish television and radio several times and has given many free public lectures on astronomy and asteroseismology.

Christensen-Dalsgaard obtained his PhD from the University of Cambridge in 1978, under the supervision of Douglas Gough.

In 2022 he was awarded the Kavli Prize in Astrophysics.

Works

 Lecture Notes on Stellar Oscillations (only author)

References

External links
 
 www.denstoredanske.dk

1950 births
Living people
20th-century Danish astronomers
Foreign associates of the National Academy of Sciences
21st-century Danish astronomers